The Empire State League was a Minor league baseball circuit which operated in the 1913 season. It was a Class-D, six-team league, with teams based exclusively in Georgia, U.S. In 1914, the league evolved to become the Georgia State League.

Cities represented 
 Americus, GA: Americus Muckalees 1913 
 Brunswick, GA: Brunswick Pilots 1913 
 Cordele, GA: Cordele Babies 1913 
 Thomasville, GA: Thomasville Hornets 1913 
 Valdosta, GA: Valdosta Millionaires 1913 
 Waycross, GA: Waycross Blowhards 1913

Standings & statistics

Notes
 In the best-of-seven series, second place Thomasville defeated first place Valdosta, four games to two.
 Henry Chancey (Americus) won the batting title (.383), while Vincent Roth (Thomasville) collected 18 wins and Red Dacey (Americus) posted the best W-L% (9-3, .750).
 In 1914, the Empire State League renamed itself Georgia State League.

Players of note
Willie Clark
Dutch Jordan
Charles Moran
Harry Weber

Sources

External links
Baseball Reference: 1913 Empire State League

Baseball leagues in Georgia (U.S. state)
Defunct minor baseball leagues in the United States
Sports leagues established in 1913
Sports leagues disestablished in 1913